Krishna Rao is an American film, television director and cinematographer.

As a director, he has directed episodes of Dawson's Creek, Angel, The Pretender, The Chronicle, She Spies, The Unit, 90210 also working as a cinematographer on three of the latter series. In 1997, his first directorial credit was the sci-fi film Crossworlds.

Rao has also worked as a camera operator on number of notable films namely, Halloween (1978), The Fog (1980) (both directed by John Carpenter), Bachelor Party (1984), Predator 2 (1990), Ricochet (1991) and Star Trek Generations (1994).

References

External links

American cinematographers
American film directors
American television directors
American television producers
Living people
Place of birth missing (living people)
Year of birth missing (living people)